The overflow downdraw method or fusion method is a technique for producing flat glass. The key advantage of this technique as compared to the float glass process is that the pristine surfaces are not touched by molten tin. The technique is used for the production of very thin flat panel display glass by the companies Asahi Glass Co., Corning,  Nippon Electric Glass,
Samsung Corning Precision Materials, 
and various other companies operating in the field of display glass and other types of thin glass.

The fusion method was originally conceived by Corning in the 1960s as a method for manufacturing automotive windshields. Shelved for years, the technology was reintroduced to supply the flat screen display market.
A sheet of glass is formed when molten glass overflows from a supply trough, flows down both sides, and rejoins (fuses) at the tapered bottom, where it is drawn away in sheet form.

References

External links
 US Patent 851627, June 15, 2004
 US Patent 6990834, January 31, 2006
 Huey-Jiuan Lin, Wei-Kuo Chang: Design of a sheet forming apparatus for overflow fusion process by numerical simulation; Journal of Non-Crystalline Solids, Volume 353, Issues 30-31, 1 October 2007, Pages 2817-2825 Full text article
 description of the fusion overflow process at the Corning website

Glass production